Elena Tsallagova is a Russian operatic soprano who has performed at major opera houses and festivals in Europe. She was noticed internationally as Nanetta in Verdi's Falstaff at the Glyndebourne Festival, and in the title role of Janáček's The Cunning Little Vixen at the Paris Opera. She has been a member of Deutsche Oper Berlin since 2013, performing lead roles such as Debussy's Mélisande, Gilda in Verdi's Rigoletto and Sophie in Der Rosenkavalier by Richard Strauss.

Career 
Tsallagova was born in Vladikavkaz to an Ossetian family. Her father was a singer in an opera chorus, and her mother a choral conductor. She took ballet training from age five to 15 and intended to become a dancer. She studied voice at the Saint Petersburg Conservatory. She won first prize in the Rachmaninov competition there, and began performing at the Mariinsky Theatre. She moved to France to study with Ileana Cotrubas for two months. In 2006, she was accepted to the Atelier Lyrique, the opera studio of the Paris Opera. She first appeared at the Salzburg Festival in 2007, as Zelmira in Haydn's Armida. The same year, she performed at the Ravenna Festival as Livietta in Cimarosa's Il ritorno di Don Calandrino, conducted by Riccardo Muti. In 2008, she appeared in the title role of Janáček's The Cunning Little Vixen at the Paris Opera, in a performance recorded on a DVD that received a Victoires de la Musique award in 2009.

She was a member of the Bavarian State Opera in Munich from 2008, where she appeared as Despina in Mozart's Così fan tutte, Zerlina in Don Giovanni, Sophie in Massenet's Werther, Nannetta in Verdi's Falstaff, Musetta in Puccini's La Bohème, Creusa in Simon Mayr's Medea in Corinto, Isotta in Die schweigsame Frau by Richard Strauss, and Donna Clara in Zemlinsky's Der Zwerg. In 2009, she performed as Nannetta with the Glyndebourne Touring Opera.

In 2012, she made her role debut as Mélisande in Debussy's Pelléas et Mélisande (opera) at the Paris Opera. She became a member of the Deutsche Oper Berlin with the 2013/14 season where she appeared as Pamina in Mozart's Die Zauberflöte, Gilda in Verdi's Rigoletto, Micaela in Bizet's Carmen, Sophie in Der Rosenkavalier by Strauss, and as Adina in Donizetti's L'elisir d'amore.

In 2022, she was the Vixen again in a production of the Bavarian State Opera, directed by Barrie Kosky and conducted by Mirga Gražinytė-Tyla. A reviewer described her voice as lyric with a capacity for expansion and almost electric  vocal energy ("... mit vokaler Energie geradezu elektrisch auflädt"), and her acting as completely natural, and interesting when only looking around a corner ("eine Darstellerin, die sich vollkommen natürlich entfalten kann, die interessiert, sobald sie nur um die Bühnenecke lugt").

Recordings 
 Mayr: Medea in Corinto. Munich, 2010, DVD directed by Hans Neuenfels. Nadja Michael, Ramón Vargas, Alastair Miles, Alek Shrader, Elena Tsallagova, choir and orchestra of the Bavarian State Opera conducted by Ivor Bolton. Arthaus  2010 , 
 Debussy's Pelléas et Mélisande. Paris, 2012, DVD directed by Robert Wilson. Orchestre de l'Opéra national de Paris, Philippe Jordan conducting, Stéphane Degout (Pelléas); Elena Tsallagova (Mélisande); Vincent Le Texier (Golaud); Anne Sofie von Otter (Geneviève); Franz-Josef Selig (Arkel); Julie Mathevet (The little Ynold); Jérôme Varnier. Naive # 2159 
 Zemlinsky: Der Zwerg. Berlin, 2020, DVD directed by Tobias Kratzer. Elena Tsallagova, David Butt Philip, Emily Magee, Philipp Jekal, choir and orchestra of Deutsche Oper Berlin conducted by Donald Runnicles. Naxos Cat: NBD0108V.  Nominated for a Grammy Award in 2021.

References

Further reading

External links 

 Elena Tsallagova / Soprano operabase.com
 
 Elena Tsallagova (management) imgartists.com 2022

Russian operatic sopranos
Saint Petersburg Conservatory alumni
Living people
Year of birth missing (living people)
21st-century Russian women opera singers
People from Vladikavkaz
Ossetian people